VOR or vor may refer to:

Organizations 
 Vale of Rheidol Railway in Wales
 Voice of Russia, a radio broadcaster
 Volvo Ocean Race, a yacht race

Science, technology and medicine 
 VHF omnidirectional range, a radio navigation aid used in aviation
 Vestibulo-ocular reflex, a reflex eye movement
 Voice-operated recording, see Voice-operated switch
 Visual Operating Rules, another term for visual flight rules in aviation
 Video operation room, part of the set-up for the video assistant referee in association football

Entertainment 
 Vor of Barrayar, the noble families of Barrayar in the science fiction Vorkosigan Saga
 Vor (Star Wars), a race in the Star Wars universe
 VOR, a 1958 science fiction novel by James Blish
 Vor Daj, protagonist of the 1940 novel Synthetic Men of Mars by Edgar Rice Burroughs
 Russian title of the 1997 film The Thief
 VOR: The Maelstrom, a science fiction miniature wargame
 VOR, a search engine and media company in the Doctor Who episode "Spyfall"

Other uses 
 The goddess Vör in Norse mythology
 vor, ISO 639-3 code for the Voro language of Nigeria
Version of record, a fixed copyedited, typeset and formatted manuscript

See also 
 Vor v zakone, or thief in law, a rank in the Russian Mafia